The National Archaeological Museum of Chiusi is a museum in Chiusi, Siena, Italy. It contains Ancient Greek and Etruscan items, many of which have been excavated in the surrounding province. The museum also has a restoration laboratory, specializing in archaeological materials.

Some excavated items

Sources 

Chiusi
Etruscans museums in Italy
Museums in the Province of Siena